Middlethorpe is the name of three settlements in England:

 Middlethorpe, North Yorkshire, a hamlet in the City of York
Middlethorpe Hall, a historic house
 Middlethorpe, East Riding of Yorkshire, a hamlet in the civil parish of Londesborough
 Middlethorpe, Lincolnshire, a hamlet in the civil parish of West Ashby